Czech Lion Award for Best Film is award given to the Czech film with best soundtrack.

Winners

External links

Film music awards
Czech Lion Awards
Awards established in 1993